Gabriel Rybar Blos (born 28 February 1989), or simply Gabriel, was a Brazilian professional footballer who played as a centre back for Grêmio. He's injured since September 2013, when he had problems with ligaments and had to undergo surgery on his left knee. He ended his professional career in June 2020.

Career statistics

References

External links
 Gabriel at Portal Oficial do Grêmio
 
 

1989 births
Living people
Brazilian footballers
Association football central defenders
Pato Branco Esporte Clube players
Clube Esportivo Lajeadense players
Rio Branco Football Club players
Grêmio Foot-Ball Porto Alegrense players
Campeonato Brasileiro Série A players